Jones Ordway House is a historic home located at Glens Falls, Warren County, New York.  It was built about 1850 and is a two half story, "T" shaped brick vernacular residence.  It was extensively remodeled in the 1880s in a picturesque Queen Anne style.

It was added to the National Register of Historic Places in 1984.

See also
 National Register of Historic Places listings in Warren County, New York

References

Houses on the National Register of Historic Places in New York (state)
Houses completed in 1850
Houses in Warren County, New York
National Register of Historic Places in Warren County, New York